In geometry, the tangent line (or simply tangent) to a plane curve at a given point is the straight line that "just touches" the curve at that point. Leibniz defined it as the line through a pair of infinitely close points on the curve. More precisely, a straight line is said to be a tangent of a curve  at a point  if the line passes through the point  on the curve and has slope , where f is the derivative of f. A similar definition applies to space curves and curves in n-dimensional Euclidean space.

As it passes through the point where the tangent line and the curve meet, called the point of tangency, the tangent line is "going in the same direction" as the curve, and is thus the best straight-line approximation to the curve at that point.

The tangent line to a point on a differentiable curve can also be thought of as a tangent line approximation, the graph of the affine function that best approximates the original function at the given point.

Similarly, the tangent plane to a surface at a given point is the plane that "just touches" the surface at that point. The concept of a tangent is one of the most fundamental notions in differential geometry and has been extensively generalized; .

The word "tangent" comes from the Latin , "to touch".

History

Euclid makes several references to the tangent ( ephaptoménē) to a circle in book III of the Elements  (c. 300 BC). In Apollonius' work Conics (c. 225 BC) he defines a tangent as being a line such that no other straight line could
fall between it and the curve.

Archimedes (c.  287 – c.  212 BC) found the tangent to an Archimedean spiral by considering the path of a point moving along the curve.

In the 1630s Fermat developed the technique of adequality to calculate tangents and other problems in analysis and used this to calculate tangents to the parabola. Independently Descartes used his method of normals based on the observation that the radius of a circle is always normal to the circle itself.

These methods led to the development of differential calculus in the 17th century. Many people contributed. Roberval discovered a general method of drawing tangents, by considering a curve as described by a moving point whose motion is the resultant of several simpler motions.
René-François de Sluse and Johannes Hudde found algebraic algorithms for finding tangents. Further developments included those of John Wallis and Isaac Barrow, leading to the theory of Isaac Newton and Gottfried Leibniz.
 
An 1828 definition of a tangent was "a right line which touches a curve, but which when produced, does not cut it". This old definition prevents inflection points from having any tangent. It has been dismissed and the modern definitions are equivalent to those of Leibniz, who defined the tangent line as the line through a pair of infinitely close points on the curve.

Tangent line to a plane curve

The intuitive notion that a tangent line "touches" a curve can be made more explicit by considering the sequence of straight lines (secant lines) passing through two points, A and B, those that lie on the function curve. The tangent at A is the limit when point B approximates or tends to A. The existence and uniqueness of the tangent line depends on a certain type of mathematical smoothness, known as "differentiability." For example, if two circular arcs meet at a sharp point (a vertex) then there is no uniquely defined tangent at the vertex because the limit of the progression of secant lines depends on the direction in which "point B" approaches the vertex.

At most points, the tangent touches the curve without crossing it (though it may, when continued, cross the curve at other places away from the point of tangent). A point where the tangent (at this point) crosses the curve is called an inflection point. Circles, parabolas, hyperbolas and ellipses do not have any inflection point, but more complicated curves do have, like the graph of a cubic function, which has exactly one inflection point, or a sinusoid, which has two inflection points per each period of the sine.

Conversely, it may happen that the curve lies entirely on one side of a straight line passing through a point on it, and yet this straight line is not a tangent line. This is the case, for example, for a line passing through the vertex of a triangle and not intersecting it otherwise—where the tangent line does not exist for the reasons explained above. In convex geometry, such lines are called supporting lines.

Analytical approach
The geometrical idea of the tangent line as the limit of secant lines serves as the motivation for analytical methods that are used to find tangent lines explicitly. The question of finding the tangent line to a graph, or the tangent line problem, was one of the central questions leading to the development of calculus in the 17th century. In the second book of his Geometry, René Descartes said of the problem of constructing the tangent to a curve, "And I dare say that this is not only the most useful and most general problem in geometry that I know, but even that I have ever desired to know".

Intuitive description
Suppose that a curve is given as the graph of a function, y = f(x). To find the tangent line at the point p = (a, f(a)), consider another nearby point q = (a + h, f(a + h)) on the curve. The slope of the secant line passing through p and q is equal to the difference quotient

 

As the point q approaches p, which corresponds to making h smaller and smaller, the difference quotient should approach a certain limiting value k, which is the slope of the tangent line at the point p. If k is known, the equation of the tangent line can be found in the point-slope form:

More rigorous description
To make the preceding reasoning rigorous, one has to explain what is meant by the difference quotient approaching a certain limiting value k. The precise mathematical formulation was given by Cauchy in the 19th century and is based on the notion of limit. Suppose that the graph does not have a break or a sharp edge at p and it is neither plumb nor too wiggly near p. Then there is a unique value of k such that, as h approaches 0, the difference quotient gets closer and closer to k, and the distance between them becomes negligible compared with the size of h, if h is small enough. This leads to the definition of the slope of the tangent line to the graph as the limit of the difference quotients for the function f. This limit is the derivative of the function f at x = a, denoted f ′(a). Using derivatives, the equation of the tangent line can be stated as follows:

 

Calculus provides rules for computing the derivatives of functions that are given by formulas, such as the power function, trigonometric functions, exponential function, logarithm, and their various combinations. Thus, equations of the tangents to graphs of all these functions, as well as many others, can be found by the methods of calculus.

How the method can fail
Calculus also demonstrates that there are functions and points on their graphs for which the limit determining the slope of the tangent line does not exist. For these points the function f is non-differentiable. There are two possible reasons for the method of finding the tangents based on the limits and derivatives to fail: either the geometric tangent exists, but it is a vertical line, which cannot be given in the point-slope form since it does not have a slope, or the graph exhibits one of three behaviors that precludes a geometric tangent.

The graph y = x1/3 illustrates the first possibility:  here the difference quotient at a = 0 is equal to h1/3/h = h−2/3, which becomes very large as h approaches 0. This curve has a tangent line at the origin that is vertical.

The graph y = x2/3 illustrates another possibility: this graph has a cusp at the origin. This means that, when h approaches 0, the difference quotient at a = 0 approaches plus or minus infinity depending on the sign of x. Thus both branches of the curve are near to the half vertical line for which y=0, but none is near to the negative part of this line. Basically, there is no tangent at the origin in this case, but in some context one may consider this line as a tangent, and even, in algebraic geometry, as a double tangent.

The graph y = |x| of the absolute value function consists of two straight lines with different slopes joined at the origin. As a point q approaches the origin from the right, the secant line always has slope 1. As a point q approaches the origin from the left, the secant line always has slope −1. Therefore, there is no unique tangent to the graph at the origin. Having two different (but finite) slopes is called a corner.

Finally, since differentiability implies continuity, the contrapositive states discontinuity implies non-differentiability. Any such jump or point discontinuity will have no tangent line. This includes cases where one slope approaches positive infinity while the other approaches negative infinity, leading to an infinite jump discontinuity

Equations
When the curve is given by y = f(x) then the slope of the tangent is 
so by the point–slope formula the equation of the tangent line at (X, Y) is

When the equation of the curve is given in the form  f(x, y) = 0 then the value of the slope can be found by implicit differentiation, giving

The equation of the tangent line at a point (X,Y) such that f(X,Y) = 0 is then

This equation remains true if  but  (in this case the slope of the tangent is infinite). If  the tangent line is not defined and the point (X,Y) is said to be singular.

For algebraic curves, computations may be simplified somewhat by converting to homogeneous coordinates. Specifically, let the homogeneous equation of the curve be g(x, y, z) = 0 where g is a homogeneous function of degree n. Then, if (X, Y, Z) lies on the curve, Euler's theorem implies

It follows that the homogeneous equation of the tangent line is

The equation of the tangent line in Cartesian coordinates can be found by setting z=1 in this equation.

To apply this to algebraic curves, write f(x, y) as

where each ur is the sum of all terms of degree r. The homogeneous equation of the curve is then

Applying the equation above and setting z=1 produces

as the equation of the tangent line. The equation in this form is often simpler to use in practice since no further simplification is needed after it is applied.

If the curve is given parametrically by

then the slope of the tangent is

If  the tangent line is not defined. However, it may occur that the tangent line exists and may be computed from an implicit equation of the curve.

Normal line to a curve

The line perpendicular to the tangent line to a curve at the point of tangency is called the normal line to the curve at that point. The slopes of perpendicular lines have product −1, so if the equation of the curve is y = f(x) then slope of the normal line is

and it follows that the equation of the normal line at (X, Y) is

Similarly, if the equation of the curve has the form f(x, y) = 0 then the equation of the normal line is given by

If the curve is given parametrically by

then the equation of the normal line is

Angle between curves

The angle between two curves at a point where they intersect is defined as the angle between their tangent lines at that point. More specifically, two curves are said to be tangent at a point if they have the same tangent at a point, and orthogonal if their tangent lines are orthogonal.

Multiple tangents at a point

The formulas above fail when the point is a singular point. In this case there may be two or more branches of the curve that pass through the point, each branch having its own tangent line. When the point is the origin, the equations of these lines can be found for algebraic curves by factoring the equation formed by eliminating all but the lowest degree terms from the original equation. Since any point can be made the origin by a change of variables (or by translating the curve) this gives a method for finding the tangent lines at any singular point.

For example, the equation of the limaçon trisectrix shown to the right is

Expanding this and eliminating all but terms of degree 2 gives

which, when factored, becomes

So these are the equations of the two tangent lines through the origin.

When the curve is not self-crossing, the tangent at a reference point may still not be uniquely defined because the curve is not differentiable at that point although it is differentiable elsewhere. In this case the left and right derivatives are defined as the limits of the derivative as the point at which it is evaluated approaches the reference point from respectively the left (lower values) or the right (higher values). For example, the curve y = |x | is not differentiable at x = 0: its left and right derivatives have respective slopes −1 and 1; the tangents at that point with those slopes are called the left and right tangents.

Sometimes the slopes of the left and right tangent lines are equal, so the tangent lines coincide. This is true, for example, for the curve y = x 2/3, for which both the left and right derivatives at x = 0 are infinite; both the left and right tangent lines have equation x = 0.

Tangent line to a space curve

Tangent circles

Two circles of non-equal radius, both in the same plane, are said to be tangent to each other if they meet at only one point. Equivalently, two circles, with radii of ri and centers at (xi, yi), for i = 1, 2 are said to be tangent to each other if

 Two circles are externally tangent  if the distance between their centres is equal to the sum of their radii.

 Two circles are internally tangent  if the distance between their centres is equal to the difference between their radii.

Tangent plane to a surface

The tangent plane to a surface at a given point p is defined in an analogous way to the tangent line in the case of curves. It is the best approximation of the surface by a plane at p, and can be obtained as the limiting position of the planes passing through 3 distinct points on the surface close to p as these points converge to p.

Higher-dimensional manifolds

More generally, there is a k-dimensional tangent space at each point of a k-dimensional manifold in the n-dimensional Euclidean space.

See also
 Newton's method
 Normal (geometry)
 Osculating circle
 Osculating curve
 Perpendicular
 Subtangent
 Supporting line
 Tangent cone
 Tangential angle
 Tangential component
 Tangent lines to circles
 Tangent vector
 Multiplicity (mathematics)#Behavior of a polynomial function near a multiple root
 Algebraic curve#Tangent at a point

References

Sources

External links

 
 
 Tangent to a circle With interactive animation
 Tangent and first derivative — An interactive simulation

Differential geometry
Differential topology
Analytic geometry
Elementary geometry